Karli is a small settlement in the City Municipality of Koper in the Littoral region of Slovenia close to the border with Croatia. Its relative isolation has resulted in its population moving to larger settlements and there are no permanent residents left.

References

External links
Karli on Geopedia

Populated places in the City Municipality of Koper